The following is a list of episodes for the Canadian documentary television series A Scattering of Seeds, also known as A Scattering of Seeds: The Creation of Canada.

The series explored the contributions of immigrants to Canada. It was produced by White Pine Pictures. A total of 52 episodes originally aired on the History channel from 1998 to 2001, with repeats on various Canadian Television Networks, such as CBC Television, Société Radio-Canada (in French), TVOntario, Vision TV and The Discovery Channel.

Series overview

Episodes

Season 1 (1998)

Season 2 (1999)

Season 3 (2000)

Season 4 (2001)

External links
 
 A Scattering of Seeds: The Creation of Canada - White Pine Pictures

Scattering of Seeds